Lee Chul-seung is the name of:
 Lee Chul-seung (1922–2016), politician
 Lee Chul-seung (born 1972), table tennis player